Hot Ones is an American YouTube talk show, created by Christopher Schonberger and Sean Evans and produced by First We Feast and Complex Media. Its basic premise involves celebrities being interviewed by Evans over a platter of increasingly spicy chicken wings.  

286 episodes including one bonus episode and one removed episode have been released as of March 16, 2023.

Series overview

Episodes

Season 1 (2015)

Season 2 (2015–2016)

Season 3 (2017)

Season 4 (2017)

Season 5 (2018)

Season 6 (2018)

Season 7 (2018)

Season 8 (2019)

Season 9 (2019)

Season 10 (2019)

Season 11 (2020)

Season 12 (2020)

Season 13 (2020)

Season 14 (2021)

Season 15 (2021)

Season 16 (2021)

Season 17 (2022)

Season 18 (2022)

Season 19 (2022)

Season 20 (2023)

Specials

Notes

References

External links
 

Hot Ones